The Lüliang Mountains are a mountain range in central China, dividing Shanxi's Fen River valley from the Yellow River. The range forces the Yellow River southwards on the eastern side of the Ordos Loop but tapers off to the south, where the Fen turns west to join the Yellow River before the Qin Mountains turn the combined river sharply eastward at its confluence with the Wei at Tongguan in Shaanxi.

See also 
 Taihang Mountains in eastern Shanxi, dividing the Fen valley from the North China Plain
 Greater Khingan in Manchuria, which runs south form the Taihang and Lüliang
 Tongguan and Hangu Pass, passes between the Lüliang foothills and the Qin Mountains

References 

Mountain ranges of Shanxi